Loreto is a quarter of the city of Lugano, in the Swiss canton of Ticino. It forms the part of the city which surrounds the shrine of Our Lady of Loreto to the south of the city center, and includes the Lake Lugano waterfront south of the city centre but north of Paradiso. In 2011, it had a population of 3,221.

References

External links 
 
 Loreto pages on City of Lugano web site (in Italian)

Villages in Ticino
Districts of Lugano